"I Just Can't Breathe..." is the Brilliant Green's twentieth single, released on August 18, 2010. It peaked at #33 on the Oricon Singles Chart.

Track listing

References

2010 singles
2010 songs
Songs written by Shunsaku Okuda
Songs written by Tomoko Kawase
The Brilliant Green songs
Warner Music Japan singles